is a TV station affiliated with Fuji News Network (FNN) and Fuji Network System (FNS) serving in Hokkaido, Japan, headquartered in Sapporo, established in 1971.

Through its Hakodate translator, UHB functions as the default FNN affiliate for most of neighboring Aomori Prefecture to the south, as that area does not have an FNN affiliate of its own.

History 
In October 1969, the Ministry of Post (currently the Ministry of Internal Communications) approved the fourth TV license in Hokkaido, which attracted 59 companies to apply. At that time, both Hokkaido Shimbun and Fuji Television were interested in obtaining television licenses. With the help of the prefectural government of Hokkaido, the 59 applicant companies were then integrated into Hokkaido Cultural Broadcasting centered on Hokkaido Shimbun and Fuji TV, and officially obtained a license in May 1971. The broadcaster was founded on June 19, 1971 and began trial broadcasts on January 14, 1972 prior to the 1972 Winter Olympics, the first of a kind in Asia.

At exactly 07:20am on April 1, 1972, UHB began broadcasting with "Today's Weather" being the first program to be broadcast. When it first commenced broadcasts, coverage area was just at 66% of households (initially at Sapporo, Hakodate, Asahikawa, and Muroan) and increased after half a year to 81.9% (expanding to Obihiro, Kushiro, and Abashiri). In 1981, Fuji TV assisted UHB in producing the TV drama series From The Northern Country (aired between 1981-2002), which was an unprecedented success. It achieved more than 20% in ratings, and also promoted tourism in the Furano area, where the drama is produced. In 1991, UHB becomes responsible for FNN's Moscow bureau. On October 1, 1983, UHB introduced its current logo featuring lowercase letters. They also started using an electronic news gathering (ENG) in 1982 and stereo sound and bilingual broadcasting in 1984 Digital terrestrial broadcasts commence in Sapporo on June 1, 2006 and ceased analog broadcasts on July 24, 2011.

References

External links
 The official website of Hokkaido Cultural Broadcasting 

Fuji News Network
Television stations in Japan
Television channels and stations established in 1972
Mass media in Sapporo